The Osborne Naval Shipyard is a multi-user facility at Osborne on the Lefevre Peninsula in South Australia. It was established in 1987 for the Australian Submarine Corporation, and the first products of the facility were the six Collins-Class submarines.

Facilities
The ship building precinct includes a number of discrete facilities, as it has grown over the time it has existed.

The Government of South Australia built a "common user facility" that includes a wharf and Shiplift constructed between 2007 and 2010, known as Techport Australia. It was designed by Aurecon and constructed by McConnell Dowell and Built Environs.

Between 2017 and 2020, an extension was built behind Osborne South to construct the Hunter-class frigates.

In September 2021, the Morrison government scrapped the French multi-billion dollar deal to build the Attack-class submarines. Instead signing a monumental agreement with the United Kingdom and the United States to built 8 SSN-AUKUS submarines at the Osborne Naval Shipyard Adelaide for the Royal Australian Navy. The first submarine is expected in the early 2030s.

Tenants

 Kockums
 ASC Pty Ltd
 BAE Systems Australia

Products
The list of ships constructed at the Osborne facility include:
 6 Collins-Class submarines
 3 Hobart-class Air Warfare Destroyers
 2 Arafura-class offshore patrol vessels (construction commenced November 2018)
9 Hunter-class frigates (to commence in 2020 with first delivery in 2027)
 8 SSN-AUKUS submarines (the first is proposed in the early 2040s)

References

Shipyards of Australia
Manufacturing plants in Australia
Lefevre Peninsula